Coldfire may refer to:

 Atari Coldfire Project
 Coldfire (comics)
 Coldfire Trilogy, sci-fi trilogy
 NXP ColdFire, microprocessor architecture

See also
 Cold Fire (disambiguation)